RedBrick Limited was a New Zealand game company that produced role-playing games and game supplements. The company moved to the United States in 2010 and established business as RedBrick LLC. In 2018, RedBrick Publishing – the successor to RedBrick's earlier incarnations – started operations.

History
In 2005, FASA Corp granted RedBrick Limited a license for Earthdawn based on a very professional proposal they submitted. RedBrick named their line "Earthdawn Classic" to differentiate it from Living Room Games' edition and to show that they were staying closer to the art styles and setting of the original FASA line than Living Room Games had. RedBrick's line kicked off with the Earthdawn Player's Companion (2005). In 2005 and 2006, Earthdawn had two companies simultaneously publishing "official" material - but RedBrick was soon the only publisher of the game. In 2007, Holistic Design licensed Fading Suns to RedBrick Limited. RedBrick promised new supplements using the original Victory Point System, plus the eventual release of the third edition of the game, and began with a few PDF adventures published in 2007. RedBrick published their classic edition of Earthdawn through 2009, then published a third edition (2009) which they distributed through the Flaming Cobra program at Mongoose Publishing. RedBrick Limited – who had published on their own for years – brought several of their publications to Mongoose, beginning with their third edition release of the classic Earthdawn game (2009). RedBrick LLC officially ceased operations in 2012 after RedBrick's owners set up a new business with one of the founders of FASA Corporation, transferring their licenses to the nascent FASA Games, Inc.

References

External links
 RedBrick Publishing Official Homepage

Earthdawn
Role-playing game publishing companies